Clayton Anthony Rapada (born March 9, 1981) is a Filipino American former professional baseball pitcher. He played in Major League Baseball (MLB) for the Chicago Cubs, Detroit Tigers, Texas Rangers, Baltimore Orioles, New York Yankees, and Cleveland Indians. He is currently an assistant pitching coordinator for the San Francisco Giants organization.

He does however hold a unique major league record. He has a career won loss record of 8–0 for a winning percentage of 1.000. This marks the most wins for a pitcher without ever being charged with a loss, presuming he doesn't resume his playing career and records a future loss at the major league level. He is not credited for his win percentage in the official baseball records because that required a minimum of 1,000 innings pitched.

Early life
Rapada was born in Chesapeake, Virginia to a Filipino father whose roots traces to Cabangan, Zambales and an American mother. He graduated from Deep Creek High School of Chesapeake, Virginia in 1999 and was a fan of the Chicago Cubs. He then attended Virginia State University and played on the NCAA Division II Trojans baseball team. As a freshman, Rapada went 7-1 and was planning on transferring to Old Domionion before he was approached by a Chicago Cubs scout.

Career

Chicago Cubs
Rapda signed as an Undrafted Free Agent with the Chicago Cubs during the summer of 2002. Rapada started in the Chicago Cubs organization pitching for the Single-A Boise Hawks from 2002 to 2003. At the beginning of 2003, he was promoted to the Single-A Lansing Lugnuts, where he posted a 4.96 earned run average (ERA) and recorded 27 strikeouts over  innings pitched, primarily in relief.

In 2004, Cubs coaches suggested that Rapada try a sidearm delivery. Rapada showed improvement that season for the Lugnuts, going 6–6 with an ERA of 2.33 in 57 appearances.

In 2005, the Cubs moved Rapada up to the Single-A Daytona Cubs, where he went 1–3 with an ERA 3.83 in 27 appearances. 2006 saw Rapada progressing through the Cubs minor league organization, and he pitched for both the Double-A West Tenn Diamond Jaxx and the Triple-A Iowa Cubs. Between the two teams, he appeared in 61 games and posted an ERA of 1.59.

Rapada made his major league debut with the Chicago Cubs on June 14, 2007, against the Seattle Mariners. He faced one batter, Raúl Ibañez, who lined out to Cubs right fielder Cliff Floyd. Rapada was sent back to the Iowa Cubs on June 19, 2007, without making another appearance.

Detroit Tigers
On August 30, 2007, Rapada was announced as the player to be named later in the trade between the Tigers and Cubs involving outfielder Craig Monroe.

Rapada made his Tigers debut on September 9, 2007. In a coincidence, he faced Ibáñez again, giving up a three-run home run. He was pulled immediately after, giving him the distinction of facing the same batter (and only that batter) twice in his first two major league appearances; one while pitching for a National League club and the other with an American League club. He earned his first major league victory on April 15, 2008, as the Tigers beat the Minnesota Twins 6–5.

Rapada did not make the Tigers 25-man roster and began the 2009 season playing for the Toledo Mud Hens.

Texas Rangers

On December 7, 2009, Rapada was traded to the Texas Rangers for a player to be named later or cash considerations. On December 16, Rapada was outrighted off the 40-man roster to Triple-A.

Rapada played most of the 2010 season with the minor league Oklahoma City RedHawks. On September 3, 2010, Texas called up Rapada to the major league roster.

Rapada was listed as an alternative during the postseason when the Texas Rangers would make it to the World Series for the first time in franchise history. The Rangers would eventually lose the 2010 World Series against the San Francisco Giants.

Baltimore Orioles
On January 14, 2011, Rapada was placed on release waivers by the Rangers. On January 25, 2011, Rapada was signed by the Baltimore Orioles and invited to spring training to compete for a roster spot. After being sent to the minors after spring training, Rapada was called up by Baltimore on April 17. He made his Orioles debut on April 18 with two outs in the seventh inning against the Minnesota Twins. He was designated for assignment on June 29. In  innings with Baltimore, Rapada had a 6.06 ERA.

After being designated for assignment on February 6, Rapada was released by the Orioles on February 15. He leads the major leagues in left-handers' batting average who face him since 2010.

New York Yankees
Rapada signed a minor league contract with the New York Yankees on February 18, 2012, with an invitation to spring training. Rapada made the Yankees Opening Day roster. He had a 2.82 ERA in 70 appearances. After 2013 Spring Training, he was designated for assignment. He cleared waivers and was released on April 3. He was re-signed to a minor league deal on April 9 and released on June 3.

Cleveland Indians
Rapada signed a minor league contract with the Cleveland Indians on June 13, 2013. After spending most of the season with the AAA Columbus Clippers, he was added to the Indians' major-league roster as a September call-up. He was designated for assignment on October 2, 2013. After being outrighted to Triple-A Columbus on October 7, Rapada elected free agency on October 16.

Los Angeles Angels of Anaheim
Rapada signed a minor league deal with the Los Angeles Angels of Anaheim in December 2013. He was released before the end of Spring Training.

Seattle Mariners
Rapada signed a minor league deal with the Seattle Mariners in April 2014, and was assigned to Triple-A Tacoma. He pitched in 14 games, going 4–1 with a 4.12 ERA before his release on June 16.

Return to the Orioles
That day, he signed a minor league deal with the Baltimore Orioles. He reported to Triple-A Norfolk. On August 5, 2014, he was released.

San Francisco Giants
On February 5, 2015, Rapada signed a minor league deal with the San Francisco Giants.

Philippine national team
Due to his Filipino heritage, Rapada is eligible to play for the Philippine national team. He was to participate for the Philippines at the 2013 World Baseball Classic qualifiers in 2012 but did not participate citing personal reasons. Rapada led the Philippines at the 2017 World Baseball Classic qualifiers in February 2016.

Coaching career
After the 2015 season Rapada was hired as a pitching coach for the San Francisco Giants Low-A affiliate Augusta GreenJackets. He served in that role until 2021, when the Giants moved him to a role as the assistant pitching coordinator.

References

External links

1981 births
Living people
American baseball players of Filipino descent
Baltimore Orioles players
Baseball players from Virginia
Boise Hawks players
Chicago Cubs players
Columbus Clippers players
Cleveland Indians players
Daytona Cubs players
Detroit Tigers players
Iowa Cubs players
Lansing Lugnuts players
Major League Baseball pitchers
Mesa Solar Sox players
Minor league baseball coaches
Navegantes del Magallanes players
American expatriate baseball players in Venezuela
New York Yankees players
Norfolk Tides players
Oklahoma City RedHawks players
Sacramento River Cats players
Scranton/Wilkes-Barre RailRiders players
Sportspeople from Chesapeake, Virginia
Tacoma Rainiers players
Texas Rangers players
Toledo Mud Hens players
Virginia State Trojans baseball players
West Tennessee Diamond Jaxx players